The 2022 Indianapolis 8 Hours (also known as the Indianapolis 8 Hour Presented by AWS for sponsorship reasons) was the third running of the Indianapolis 8 Hour. It took place from October 6–9 2022. The race was the third round of the 2022 Intercontinental GT Challenge and the seventh and final round 2022 GT World Challenge America championships. For the 2022 race, the event returned to the IndyCar grand prix layout after having used the SCCA runoff course the previous year.

Background
The 2022 was open only to cars within GT3 regulations. GT4 cars, which had appeared in the first two races, were dropped from the race in an effort to reduce incidents caused by multi-class racing.

Adjustments were made to driver lineups for Pro class cars, with all Pro teams now required to include an FIA silver-rated driver as part of the lineup.

Supporting the race weekend were the Pirelli GT4 America Series, the TC America Series, and the GT America Series.

Entry list

Race Result

References

2022 in American motorsport
2022 in sports in Indiana